Fahrudin Pecikoza (born 11 February 1962) is a Bosnian songwriter. He has written lyrics for Bosnian, Croatian and Serbian singers.

Songwriting
Elvira Rahić
Sada znam (1995)
"A sada idem"
"Poljubit ćeš vrata"
"Ja za tebe plesala sam"
"Kako ćeš pred Boga"
Hotel "Čekanje" (2005)
"Kad odeš ti"
Miraz (2008)
"Vikend"

Željko Joksimović
Možda je to ljubav (2019)

Halid Bešlić
U ime ljubavi (2000)
"Ne bolujem"
Prvi poljubac (2003)
"Lijepa pa i pametna"
"Moja jedina"
"Plavo oko"
Halid 08 (2007)
"Miljacka"
Romanija (2013)
"Sijede"

Hari Mata Hari
Ja te volim najviše na svijetu (1988)
"Ja te volim najviše na svijetu"
"Ruža bez trna"
"Zapleši"
Volio bi' da te ne volim (1989)
"Volio bi' da te ne volim"
"Ti znaš sve"
"Na more dođite"
Strah me da te volim (1990)
"Strah me da te volim"
"Prsten i zlatni lanac"
"Ostavi suze za kraj"
"Lud sam za tobom"
"Ne budi me"
"Otkud ti ko' sudbina"
"Nek' nebo nam sudi"
"Daj još jednom da čujem ti glas"
Lejla (2006)

Jelena Karleuša
Ženite se momci (1996)
"A sada idem"

Neda Ukraden
Poslije nas (1990)
"Poslije nas"
"Ko te ne zna"
"Krijem da te volim"
"Ne zna srce"
"Idi, neću zaplakati"
"Zar čekala nisam dugo"

Severina Vučković
Dobrodošao u klub (2012)
"Slaba na slabića"

Tajči
Hajde da ludujemo (1990)
"Ti nemaš prava na mene"
"Nema više ljubavi"
Bube u glavi (1991)
"Gori mi pod nogama"

References

External links
Fahrudin Pecikoza discography at Discogs

Living people
1962 births
Bosnia and Herzegovina songwriters
Bosniaks of Bosnia and Herzegovina